is a former Japanese football player.

Playing career
Makino was born in Hyogo Prefecture on April 11, 1969. After graduating from high school, he joined Japan Soccer League club Furukawa Electric (later JEF United Ichihara) in 1988. He played 27 matches and 9 goals in the league. In 1992, Japan Soccer League was folded and founded new league J1 League. In 1994, he moved to Japan Football League club Cerezo Osaka. The club was promoted to J1 in 1995. However he could not play at all in the match and retired end of 1995 season.

Club statistics

References

External links

1969 births
Living people
Association football people from Hyōgo Prefecture
Japanese footballers
Japan Soccer League players
J1 League players
Japan Football League (1992–1998) players
JEF United Chiba players
Cerezo Osaka players
Association football forwards